The 2015 FIBA Europe Under-18 Championship for Women Division C was the 10th edition of the Division C of the FIBA U18 Women's European Championship, the third tier of the European women's under-18 basketball championship. It was played in Gibraltar from 6 to 11 July 2015. Scotland women's national under-18 basketball team won the tournament.

Participating teams

Final standings

References

External links
FIBA official website

2015
2015–16 in European women's basketball
FIBA U18
Sports competitions in Gibraltar
FIBA